The São Tomé weaver (Ploceus sanctithomae) is a species of bird in the family Ploceidae. It is endemic to São Tomé and Príncipe. They are found in the island of São Tomé. Its natural habitats are subtropical or tropical moist lowland forests and subtropical or tropical moist montane forests.

References

External links
 Sao Tome Weaver -  Species text in Weaver Watch.

Ploceus
Endemic birds of São Tomé and Príncipe
Fauna of São Tomé Island
Birds described in 1848
Taxonomy articles created by Polbot